Dandelion Racing is a Japanese racing team, mainly running in Super Formula. The team was founded by Kiyoshi Muraoka in 1989 as "Dandelion Racing Project".

Early years (1993-1998)
The team made a small sponsor contract with NTT Docomo in 1993. It made a way to enter the Japanese local racing series. The team ran in the All-Japan Formula Three Championship (1993 and 1994 seasons) and Japanese Touring Car Championship (1995, 1996, 1997, and 1998), and suffered from poor results through the 1990s.

The relationship with NTT Docomo will continue to date, though there is no capital ties.

Formula Nippon/Super Formula (1999- )
In 1999, the team switched from the defunct JTCC to Formula Nippon as a Honda engine user. Though the team continuously suffered from poor result at first, the fortune was changed in the 2002 season when Richard Lyons scored team's first point-finish in the series with finishing 2nd at the SUGO round.

In the 2003 season, Lyons won the Suzuka round in July. It was also the first race win for the team. In the 2004 season, Lyons became the drivers' champion of the series and the team finished as 3rd in the teams' championship. During the following years, the team came to leave steady results. In 2012, the last season of Formula Nippon, the team became the teams' champion of the series with beating TOM'S at the final round of the season.

Complete Formula Nippon/Super Formula results
(key) (Races in bold indicate pole position) (Races in italics indicate fastest lap)

Notable and veteran drivers

Formula Nippon/Super Formula
  Richard Lyons (2002–2005, 2009)
 Naoki Hattori (2003–2005)
 Takuya Izawa (2009–2013, 2017)
 Tomoki Nojiri (2014–2018)
 Stoffel Vandoorne (2016)

External links

 Dandelion Racing official website - 

Japanese auto racing teams
Formula Nippon teams
Super Formula teams
Japanese Formula 3 Championship teams
Auto racing teams established in 1989
1989 establishments in Japan
Honda in motorsport